The 1998 NCAA men's volleyball tournament was the 29th annual tournament to determine the national champion of NCAA men's collegiate volleyball. The single elimination tournament was played at the Stan Sheriff Center in Honolulu, Hawaiʻi during May 1998. With a total tournament attendance of 18,901, this remains this best attended men's volleyball championship.

UCLA defeated Pepperdine in the final match, 3–0 (15–11, 15–11, 15–7), to win their seventeenth national title. The Bruins (28–4) were coached by Al Scates.

UCLA's Adam Naeve was named the tournament's Most Outstanding Player. Neve, along with five other players, comprised the All-Tournament Team.

Qualification
Until the creation of the NCAA Men's Division III Volleyball Championship in 2012, there was only a single national championship for men's volleyball. As such, all NCAA men's volleyball programs, whether from Division I, Division II, or Division III, were eligible. A total of 4 teams were invited to contest this championship.

Tournament bracket 
Site: Stan Sheriff Center, Honolulu, Hawaiʻi

All tournament team 
Adam Naeve, UCLA (Most outstanding player)
Fred Robins, UCLA
Brandon Taliaferro, UCLA
 Victor Rivera, Lewis
Rick Tune, Pepperdine
George Roumain, Pepperdine

See also 
 NCAA Men's National Collegiate Volleyball Championship
 NCAA Women's Volleyball Championships (Division I, Division II, Division III)

References

1998
NCAA Men's Volleyball Championship
NCAA Men's Volleyball Championship
1998 in sports in Hawaii
Volleyball in Hawaii